Vittorio Tracuzzi (2 January 1923 – 21 October 1986) was an Italian basketball player. He competed in the men's tournament at the 1948 Summer Olympics.

References

External links
 

1923 births
1986 deaths
Italian men's basketball players
Olympic basketball players of Italy
Basketball players at the 1948 Summer Olympics
Sportspeople from Messina